Andrew Felix Kaweesi was the Assistant Inspector General of Police (AIGP) Uganda, and policeman. He was the Spokesperson of Uganda Police Force from August 2016 to 2017 when he was killed. He died in the rank of a Major General (equivalent NATO code OF-7). Kaweesi joined the police during the 2001 police intake and was the first to die among that intake. In 2016, Kaweesi was appointed by the Inspector General of Police (Kale Kayihura) to be the head of the Police's public relations department.

Background 
Kaweesi was born in Kyazanga, Lwengo district. His parents (Esther and Alfonse Mutabazi) passed on during his childhood and this left him and his siblings in the hands of his relatives. Kaweesi's parents left for them a 640-acre land in Kitwekyagonja village in Lwengo district. Later on, Kaweesi mobilised his siblings to put up a structure on that land. He then married Annet Kaweesi who he had with 4 children. The fifth child was born the following day after Kaweesi's burial. This child was named after Kaweesi in remembrance of his father.

Formal education 
Kaweesi attended primary school at St. Jude primary school from 1982 to 1989. He joined St. Benard college school, Kiswera for his O'level education and he finished his A'level education at Kitante High school from 1994–1996. Kaweesi studied Bachelors of Arts in Education for the undergraduate level at Makerere University from 1996 to 1999. He later proceeded for masters at Nkumba University and the University of Nairobi where he studied Masters of Education Planning and Management and Masters of International Studies respectively.

Public service 
 2015 to 2017: Director of Human Resource Development/Spokesperson Uganda Police Force
 September 2014: Director of Operations Uganda Police Force.
 2007–2010: Commandant Police Training School Kabalye.
 2009: Commandant Police Training School Kabalye.
 2006–2009: Personal Assistant to the Inspector General of police.
 2005: Police training consultant for amor Police Academy Somalia.
 2004–2005: Deputy Commandant police training school Masindi.
 Feb-May 2004: Police Consultant for Southern Sudan under the Department for International Development (DFID) Fund.
 2002–2003: Officer in charge station Ntungamo District police.
 2001:  Cadet leader Police Training School Kibuli.
 2000: Personal Assistant to the District Local Government Chairperson Masaka.
 1999: Director of Studies and teacher at St.  Benard's College school Kiswera.
 1997–1999: Chairperson at Makerere Private Students Association (MUPSA)

Management and leadership courses attended 
 Management of national security 2015: Galilee International Management Institute.
 Law enforcement supervisor Course 2012: International Law Enforcement Academy.
 Strategic security studies Course 2010–2011: National Defense College Nairobi.
 Executive Police Development Course 2009: Interpol Lyon France.
 Facilitation of learning, Design and Development Course: 2008 person peacekeeping Centre- Cairo Egypt.
 Supervisory skills 2004 Makerere University Business School.
 Instructional Techniques Course: Oct 2003 Police training school Masindi.
 Managing the Training Functions: June 2003 South Africa.
 Attended Police Officer Cadet Course 2001: Police training school Kibuli.

Death 
Kaweesi was assassinated in the morning of 17 March 2017 when he was leaving his home for duty. He was travelling with one of his bodyguards, Kenneth Erau, and the driver, Geoffrey Wambewo, were also killed about 100 metres from Kaweesi's front gate. The three dead bodies were taken to Mulago National Referral Hospital for post-mortem. It was discovered that Kaweesi was shot 27 times, his bodyguard, Kenneth Erau, was shot 33 times while the driver, Geoffrey Wambewo, was shot 11 times. The police vehicle in which the three were travelling in was found to have 77 bullet holes. According to eyewitnesses, two riding motorcycles came from behind, passed by and turned back, while stopping front of and then shooting the unarmoured police vehicle which the deceased were using. Kaweesi's driver tried to increase the speed but he was overpowered by the motorbikes. Uganda has been facing assassinations with the same mode since November 2016. An example being an army officer Major Sulaiman Kiggundu who was shot dead in his car by gunmen on two motorcycles. Two days before his death, Kaweesi confided in a priest about the message he received on phone threatening his life. The message was from an unregistered number. Twenty-two people were arrested as suspects and still facing charges.

Burial 
Kaweesi was buried in his ancestral home in Kyazanga, Lwengo district on Tuesday, 21 March. Prior to that, Kaweesi's body was taken to St. Andrew's Church, Kulambiro, Ntinda, Kampala on Sunday, 19 March, for prayers at 3:00 pm. And the vigil was held at his home, Kulambiro. Also, a mass at Rubaga Cathedral was held on Monday, 20 March for Kaweesi.

See also 
 Uganda National Police
 List of military schools in Uganda
 Notable alumni, Makerere University

References 

1974 births
2017 deaths
Deaths by firearm in Uganda
Law enforcement in Uganda
Ugandan military personnel
Makerere University alumni
Nkumba University alumni
Ugandan Roman Catholics
Male murder victims
University of Nairobi alumni